Nibea is a genus of fish in the family Sciaenidae family. 

It contains ten accepted species:

 Nibea albiflora (Richardson, 1846)
 Nibea chui  Trewavas, 1971
 Nibea coibor  (Hamilton, 1822)
 Nibea leptolepis  (Ogilby, 1918)
 Nibea maculata  (Bloch & Schneider, 1801)
 Nibea microgenys  Sasaki, 1992
 Nibea mitsukurii  (Jordan & Snyder, 1900)
 Nibea semifasciata  Chu, Lo & Wu, 1963
 Nibea soldado  (Lacepède, 1802)
 Nibea squamosa  Sasaki, 1992

References

Fish described in 1911
Fish of the Pacific Ocean
Sciaenidae
Perciformes genera